The Parque Cristal is an office and recreation building located on Avenida Francisco de Miranda in Caracas, Venezuela, which has become a famous landmark. It was seen as a symbol of development when it was constructed in 1977.

Construction and design 
The Parque Cristal was able to be constructed as a result of the Venezuelan oil boom. With its pair, the Cubo Negro, it is a "huge geometrical glass structure"; Mark Dinneen says they exemplify what was "perhaps the maximum expression of the wealth and technology of the period". The "white cube" design of the Parque Cristal is complemented by the Cubo Negro building, which is nearby and was completed around the same time. Roberto Segre describes the reflective glass design to allow "those who control" to see the activities of "all the controlled, but not vice versa".

The building is 103 meters high and has 18 floors for work and recreational space. It was designed by Jimmy Alcock, who won the Premio Metropolitano de Arquitectura (Metropolitan Architecture Prize) for his design. It has a cube-shaped structure formed by steel and concrete with glass facade. The building is located on a steep hill with poor ground conditions; this resulted in the unusual lower-floor designs as a structural solution, conceived of by engineer Enrique Arnal.

The block is split into two sections: the tall office cube and a shorter urban building in a semicircle at the back. Similarly the main entrance to the building is an open urban space with passages to the surrounding streets and the connected metro station, rising to a shopping plaza via escalators. The south facade appears to have a 'window' looking towards Parque del Este.

Of its status, Roberto Segre writes:

Facilities 
The complex contains a gas station; it has three pumps and was selling petrol at no more than six US cents per gallon in 2015.

Parque Cristal is considered an important part of Caracas' financial sector, and a marker for how the 'center' of the city has progressively moved further geographically east over time.

In popular culture 
The Parque Cristal is used as a location in Tom Clancy's Commander-in-Chief, where a covert meeting is held on the top floor after characters enter by "looking up to marvel at the remarkable architecture".

References

Further reading

 
Buildings and structures completed in 1987
Buildings and structures in Caracas
Skyscraper office buildings in Venezuela